Jambo is a wildlife anthology television series broadcast on NBC from 1969 to 1971.

Intended for children, the show was hosted and narrated by actor Marshall Thompson. Spots were filmed on location in Africa. The series was intended to be a companion of sorts to Thompson's series Daktari. Ivan Tors was creator and executive producer of both.

The title "Jambo" is a greeting in Swahili, a language used throughout East Africa.

Notes

Sources 
Terrace, Vincent. Encyclopedia of Television Shows, 1925 through 2007. Jefferson, North Carolina: McFarland & Co., 2008.

External links 
"Jambo" at imdb.com

1969 American television series debuts
1971 American television series endings
1960s American anthology television series
1970s American anthology television series
1960s American children's television series
1970s American children's television series
1960s American documentary television series
1970s American documentary television series
American children's education television series
NBC original programming
English-language television shows
Nature educational television series
Television series about animals